Allegorical Painting of Two Ladies, English School is a 17th century painting by an unknown artist. For its time period, the painting is considered unusual and "extremely rare" in its depiction of a black woman and a white woman sitting side-by-side as equals.

Description 
The painting depicts two women, one black and one white, sitting next to each other covered in beauty patches. The painting is unusual for the time in its depiction of the sitters as equals. The women are presented as companions with similar dress, makeup, hair, and jewelry. The work was created circa 1650 and subverts traditional portraiture ideals of the time period. The painting likely doesn't represent real sitters, but may have contextual relevance within contemporaneous British print culture.

Above the women is the inscription, "I black with white bespott y white with blacke this evil proceeds from thy proud hart then take her: Devill". The writing is likely intended to be moralizing, condemning the use of cosmetics and especially beauty patches, which were popular adornments at the time.

Controversy 
On 23 June 2021, the painting was sold for £220,000 at an auction house in Shropshire, England. After its sale, the purchaser applied for an export licence. The British government subsequently barred the painting from export in the hopes that a UK institution could purchase the painting.

The painting's export bar is set to be deferred on March 9, 2022.

References

English paintings
17th-century paintings